Oyster Harbour is a permanently open estuary, north of King George Sound, which covers an area of  near Albany, Western Australia. The harbour is used to shelter a fishing fleet carrying out commercial fishing and the farming of oysters and mussels via a dredged channel around Emu Point to the Emu Point Boat Pens. A significant number of waterbirds use the harbour for feeding. The place is currently a family tourist center.  Oyster Harbour is fed by the King and Kalgan Rivers and discharges into King George Sound.

A planned locality of Oyster Harbour on the Lower King Road is under construction with 2,300 home sites.

At the north eastern end near the mouth of the Kalgan River mouth are the Albany Fish Traps, a site of great significance to the local Mineng peoples, constructed over 7,500 years ago.

References 

Albany, Western Australia
King George Sound
Ports and harbours of Western Australia